Avonmouth is a port and outer suburb of Bristol, England, facing two rivers: the reinforced north bank of the final stage of the Avon which rises at sources in Wiltshire, Gloucestershire and Somerset; and the eastern shore of the Severn Estuary.  Strategically the area has been and remains an important part of the region's maritime economy particularly for larger vessels for the unloading and exporting of heavier goods as well as in industry including warehousing, light industry, electrical power and sanitation.  The area contains a junction of and is connected to the south by the M5 motorway and other roads, railway tracks and paths to the north, south-east and east.

The council ward of Avonmouth and Lawrence Weston is as drawn a simplified name as it includes Shirehampton and the western end of Lawrence Weston.

Geography 
Avonmouth is approximately rectangular, its length favouring the Severn shore and sits on the same bank as the city centre from which it lies west-north-west — at the mouth of the River Avon and on the eastern shore of the dredged, at this point highly saline Severn Estuary.  Both rivers in shallow valleys by this stage have been defensively embanked primarily to allow the construction of the large port Avonmouth Docks which occupies most of the western part. The related Royal Portbury Dock is across the Avon (in Easton-in-Gordano).  Avonmouth is home to chemical manufacturing plants, and north of the Avonmouth Docks is the gas-fired Seabank Power Station. Its light industrial and warehouse companies include Nisbets.

Its long-established residential area in Avonmouth is between the industrialised zone and the M5 motorway, uniquely for Bristol west of the M5 motorway. Avonmouth Bridge of the M5 motorway forms the connection with Somerset, specifically with Easton-in-Gordano. The Wales-connecting M49 motorway runs between the M5 near Avonmouth and the M4 motorway at the Second Severn Crossing. The old Severn Bridge and the M48 motorway are linked to Avonmouth by the A403. The Welsh cities of Newport and Cardiff are both clearly visible from Avonmouth's coastline.

The Portway, part of the A4, connects Avonmouth with the centre of Bristol.  Avonmouth is also served by a usually hourly train service to central Bristol from Avonmouth railway station on the Severn Beach Line.

A new deep-sea container terminal is planned for Avonmouth.

History 
The mouth of the Avon was recorded as Afenemuþan in the Anglo-Saxon Chronicle under the years 915 or 918 and 1052, but it is clear from the context that the name does not refer to a settlement.  The area was historically part of the chapelry of Shirehampton, a detached part of the ancient parish of Westbury-on-Trym in Gloucestershire.  Bewys Cross, a stone monument possibly dating from the 15th century, was located on the bank of the Severn close to the old mouth of the Avon. Early 19th-century maps show the area as farmland.  At that time the deep water channel of the Avon ran through the present-day site of Avonmouth Docks and separated the mainland from a small island named Dumball Island.

The first development at Avonmouth was a landing stage built in 1860 by Bristol Corporation at "Avon's Mouth".  The first record of the modern name was in the title of the Port and Channel Docks (Avonmouth Dock) Bill debated in Parliament in early 1863. When the Bristol Port Railway and Pier was built in 1865 the terminus station was named Avonmouth.  A hotel, the Avonmouth Hotel, was opened at the same time.  A small new village was built to serve the new docks, which were finally opened in 1877.  Also in 1877, the BPRP line was connected to the main railway network by the Clifton Extension Railway, and a new railway station named Avonmouth Dock was opened by the docks. Bricks for the docks were supplied by the Crown Brick Works in West Town, Shirehampton, visible on the 1879 Ordnance Survey map. The Crown Brick Works were owned by Edwin Stride, with his sons Jared and Jethro (who later developed Sneyd Park), together with George Davis and William and Jarman Peters. The Crown Brick Works company was dissolved in 1886 

The new Avonmouth Dock and the original nucleus of the settlement were transferred from Gloucestershire to the City of Bristol in 1894, and the rest of the expanding settlement became part of the City in 1904.In 1902 work began on the Royal Edward Dock, a major expansion of the docks, completed in 1908.  Land required for the expansion necessitated the closure of the original station, and from 1902 all trains terminated at Avonmouth Dock station (renamed "Avonmouth" in 1966).  However, the Avonmouth Hotel adjacent to the original station remained open. It provided accommodation for many Europeans emigrating to the Americas via Avonmouth, and during the First World War it housed the Women's Army Auxiliary Corps. It was finally demolished in 1926 when the Royal Edward Dock was expanded.

Between 1919 and 1926, the Portway was built, providing more direct road access to Avonmouth from Bristol.

Shirehampton had become a separate parish in 1844, and a Church of England chapel was established in the new settlement of Avonmouth late in the nineteenth century.  Avonmouth became a separate parish in 1917. Avonmouth's first church, completed in 1934, was bombed in World War II by the Luftwaffe in one of the six major raids of the Bristol Blitz, in 1941. It was later rebuilt in 1957.

In December 1971, the M5 motorway was opened to Avonmouth, and extended south into Somerset when the Avonmouth Bridge was opened in May 1974.

On 3 December 2020, four people were killed in an explosion at the water treatment plant.

Local places of interest

Avonmouth Sewage Works Nature Reserve 

The  Avonmouth Sewage Treatment Works is managed as a nature reserve by Wessex Water. The man-made lagoons and a pool provide a feeding and resting area for many birds including ducks such as pochard, tufted duck, teal and shoveler. The rough grassland provides a refuge for voles, great crested newt and other small mammals, which are preyed upon by kestrels and barn owls.

The Range Distribution Centre 
Avonmouth is home to the largest single footprint warehouse in the United Kingdom, a 1,250,000 sq ft portal frame building operated by The Range as a distribution centre. The enormous building occupies 55 acres of land and is part of the Central Park project located close to the Severn estuary shoreline. Previously, the largest single footprint warehouse in the United Kingdom was a building operated by Amazon in Dunfermline, Scotland which covers 1,000,000 sq ft.

Governance 
Avonmouth is part of the Bristol North West constituency, which elects a member of Parliament (MP).

As a ward of Bristol City Council which has local elections in three of every four years, Avonmouth and Lawrence Weston June 2016 to May 2018 three councillors:
Donald Alexander, Lab
Jo Sargeant, Lab
Matthew Melias, Con

Apart from Avonmouth itself, the ward includes Shirehampton and part of Lawrence Weston.
Shirehampton is a part of Bristol which has a medieval-founded village nucleus and contains buildings dating more than a century earlier than the earliest examples in Avonmouth. Today the pre-1893 mother parish of Shirehampton has definitive boundaries and  6,867 inhabitants. Shirehampton railway station provides travel to the city centre. The western end of the Lawrence Weston area crosses the boundary into the Avonmouth ward, however the majority of the area falls within the Kingsweston ward. The combined area is separated from the rest of Bristol by a small amount of green land, see buffer zones.

Notes

References

External links 

 Map of Avonmouth circa 1900

 
Areas of Bristol
Ports and harbours of the Bristol Channel
Wards of Bristol
Port of Bristol
River Avon, Bristol
Populated places on the River Severn